Haludaria melanampyx is a species of cyprinid fish endemic to India where it is known from south Kanara through the Travancore hills to the Nagercoil, Nilgiris, and Cauvery drainages in the Western Ghats, India.

References 

Haludaria
Freshwater fish of India
Endemic fauna of the Western Ghats
Taxa named by Francis Day
Fish described in 1865